Night is a Silly Symphonies animated Disney short film. It was released in 1930 by Columbia Pictures.

Summary 
The short opens to Piano Sonata No. 14 (Beethoven), the Moonlight Sonata. The sonata is hummed by the moon. Subsequently, several pairs of animals (owls, insects) dance to the sound of the sonata. Fireflies, while flying, also turn on their lights to the sound of the music. Mosquitoes and a frog walk on a lake to the sound of the music, although the frog eats the mosquitoes with its long tongue. The frog swims towards a leaf to woo a female frog, while another frog conducts a small symphony orchestra of frogs.

Reception
Variety (May 14, 1930): "Another of those Silly Symphonies from the Disney pen, and very good. Plenty funny, this one, with some new animation tricks to intrigue the trade as well as the public. It can play to any capacity and click. Script layout is episodic, change in characters coinciding with the switch in melodies. Principal innovation accompanies the well-known "Glow Worm" tune, fireflies in flight lighting up in cadence with the music. As far as known it's the first time in any cartoon for this effect. Otherwise, the moon "tra-la's" an accompaniment as its beams frolic on the water, there are a couple of comedy owls, and a bullfrog chorus which slightly slows up the pace but which can be cut at will without smearing the main impression. A trio of mosquitoes and a pair of ingenuous prancing bugs, unfolding the well-known mannerisms of hoofers, add to the merit of the reel. Old folks, as well as the kids, have evidenced a strong liking for this series. They won't be disappointed in Night."

Motion Picture News (June 28, 1930): "Clever: A lot of fun in this nonsensical cartoon. Owls performing jazz steps on water lilies; wasps turning collegiate; and even the man in the moon going in for the shimmy. Nicely synchronized and extremely diverting. Fine for any bill and particularly adaptable for hot weather entertainment. Recommended with no reservations."

Home media
The short was released on December 19, 2006, on Walt Disney Treasures: More Silly Symphonies, Volume Two.

References

External links
 

1930 films
1930 short films
1930s Disney animated short films
Silly Symphonies
Films directed by Walt Disney
Films produced by Walt Disney
1930 animated films
American black-and-white films
Columbia Pictures animated short films
Columbia Pictures short films
Animated films without speech
Animated films about frogs
1930s American films
Films about mosquitoes